The 2012 Mid-States Football Association season is made up of 13 United States college athletic programs that compete in the Mid-States Football Association (MSFA) under the National Association of Intercollegiate Athletics (NAIA) for the 2012 college football season.  The conference is divided into two leagues, the Mideast League and the Midwest league.

Marian, Saint Xavier, and Saint Francis (IN) were declared tri-champions of the Mideast league and St. Abrose, William Penn, and Grand View were tri-champions of the Midwest League.  A total of five of the teams qualified for the 2012 NAIA Football National Championship:  Saint Xavier, Marian and Saint Francis from the Mideast League ; St. Ambrose and William Penn from the Midwest League.

Regular season

Early games

Week 1

Week 2

Week 3

Week 4

Week 5

Week 6

Week 7

Week 8

Week 9

Week 10

Week 11

Postseason

First round

Quarterfinals

Semifinals

Finals

References

Mid-States Football Association
Mid-States Football Association